The State of Los Altos (Spanish: Estado de Los Altos), commonly known as Los Altos, was the 6th state of the Federal Republic of Central America from 1838 to 1840 and a short-lived independent republic from 1848 to 1849. Its capital was Quetzaltenango. Los Altos occupied eight departments in the west of present-day Guatemala as well as the Soconusco region in the Mexican state of Chiapas.

The state originated from the political differences and tensions between Guatemala City on one side, and Quetzaltenango and other parts of western Central America on the other. Debate about separation from Guatemala dated from shortly after Central American independence from Spain in 1821. Such a separate state was provided for by the Federal constitutional assembly of November 1824, but there was sizable opposition to the separation in Guatemala City.

As the liberal Federation crumbled into civil war due to the influence of the Guatemalan conservatives and the regular clergy, who had been expelled from Central America after Francisco Morazán's bloody invasion of Guatemala in 1829, Los Altos declared itself an independent republic.

The independence of Los Altos from Guatemala was officially proclaimed on 2 February 1838. The Federal government recognized Los Altos as the sixth state of the union and seated the representatives of Los Altos in the Federal Congress on 5 June of that year. The flag of Los Altos was a modification of that of the Central American Union, with a central seal showing a volcano in the background with a quetzal (a local bird symbolizing liberty) in front. This was the first Central American flag to use the quetzal as a symbol; since 1871, it has been on the present flag of Guatemala.

Administrative divisions 
Los Altos consisted of the administrative regions of 
 Totonicapán (the modern Guatemalan departments of Totonicapán, Huehuetenango), 
 Quetzaltenango (the modern departments of Quetzaltenango and San Marcos) and
 Suchitepéquez-Sololá (the modern departments of Retalhuleu, Suchitepéquez, Sololá, and Quiché).

First invasion of Rafael Carrera 

On April 2, 1838, in the city of Quetzaltenango, a secessionist group founded the independent State of Los Altos, which sought independence from Guatemala. The most important members of the Liberal Party of Guatemala and liberal enemies of the conservative regime moved to Los Altos, rather than needing to emigrate to El Salvador to live in a pro-liberal state.

The liberals in Los Altos began a harsh criticism of the Conservative government of Rivera Paz; they even had their own newspaper – El Popular, which contributed to the harsh criticism.

However, Los Altos was the most productive region with most economic activity of the former State of Guatemala; without Los Altos, conservatives lost many benefits that held the hegemony of the State of Guatemala in Central America.

The government of Guatemala tried to reach a peaceful solution, but "altenses", protected by the recognition by the Congress of the Central American Federation, did not accept this. Guatemala's government then resorted to force, sending the commanding general of the army, Rafael Carrera, to subdue Los Altos.

Carrera defeated General Agustín Guzmán when the former Mexican officer tried to ambush him and then went on to Quetzaltenango, where he imposed a harsh and hostile conservative regime for liberals. Calling all council members, he told them flatly that he was behaving kindly to them because it was the first time they had challenged him, but sternly warned them that there would be no mercy if there were to be a second time. General Guzmán and the head of state of Los Altos, Marcelo Molina, were sent to the capital of Guatemala, where they were displayed as trophies of war during a triumphant parade on February 17, 1840. Guzmán was shackled, wounds still bleeding, and riding a mule.

Second invasion of Rafael Carrera 

On March 18, 1840, liberal caudillo Francisco Morazán invaded Guatemala with 1500 soldiers to avenge the insult done in Los Altos and fearing that such action would end liberal efforts to hold together the Central American Federation. Guatemala had a cordon of guards from the border with El Salvador; without telegraph service, men ran carrying last minute messages. With the information from these messengers, Carrera hatched a plan of defense leaving his brother Sotero with troops who presented a slight resistance in the city.

Carrera pretended to flee and led the ragtag army to the heights of Aceituno as only had about four men and the same number of loads rifle, plus two old cannons. The city was at the mercy of the army of Morazán, with bells of their twenty churches ringing for divine assistance. Once Morazán reached the capital, he took it easily and freed Guzman, who immediately left for Quetzaltenango to give the news that Carrera was defeated.

Carrera then took advantage of what his enemies believed and applied a strategy of concentrating fire on the Central Park of the city. His surprise attack tactics caused heavy casualties to the army of Morazán and forced the survivors to fight for their lives. In combat, Morazán's soldiers lost the initiative and their numerical superiority. Furthermore, unaware of their surroundings in the city, Morazan's troops had to fight, carry their dead and care for their wounded while still tired by the long march from El Salvador to Guatemala.

Carrera, by then an experienced military man was able to stand up and defeat Morazán thoroughly. The disaster for the liberal general was complete:  aided by Angel Molina  who knew the streets of the city, he had to flee with his favorite men, disguised and shouting "Long live Carrera!" through the ravine of El Incienso to El Salvador, to save his life. 

In his absence Morazán had been relieved as head of state of that country, and he had to embark for exile in Perú. In Guatemala, survivors from his troops were shot without mercy, as Carrera pursued Morazan, whom he failed to catch. This lance definitely sealed the status of General Carrera and marked the decline of Morazán, and forced the conservative  criollos to negotiate with Carrera and his revolutionary peasant supporters.

Agustin Guzmán, freed by Morazán when the latter had seemingly defeated Carrera in Guatemala City, had gone back to Quetzaltenango with the good news. The city's liberal criollo leaders rapidly reinstated the Los Altos State and celebrated Morazán's victory. However, as soon as Carrera and the newly reinstated Mariano Rivera Paz heard the news, Carrera went back to Quetzaltenango with his volunteer army to regain control of the rebel liberal state once and for all.

On 2 April 1840, after entering the city, Carrera told the citizens that he had already warned them after he defeated them earlier that year. Then he ordered most of the liberal city hall officials from Los Altos shot. Carrera, then forcibly annexed Quetzaltenango and much of Los Altos back into conservative Guatemala.

After the violent and bloody reinstatement of the State of Los Altos by Carrera in April 1840, Luis Batres Juarros — conservative member of the Aycinena Clan, then secretary general of the Guatemalan government of recently reinstated Mariano Rivera Paz — obtained from the vicar Larrazabal authorization to dismantle the regionalist Church.

Active priests of Quetzaltenango — capital of the would-be-state of Los Altos — Urban Ugarte and José Maria Aguilar, were removed from their parish and likewise the priests of the parishes of San Martin Jilotepeque and San Lucas Tolimán. Larrazabal ordered the priests Fernando Antonio Dávila, Mariano Navarrete and Jose Ignacio Iturrioz to cover the parishes of Quetzaltenango, San Martin Jilotepeque and San Lucas Toliman, respectively.

The defeat of the liberal criollos in Quetzaltenango reinforced Carrera allies' status within the native population of the area, whom he respected and protected as the leader of the peasant revolution.

Taking advantage of the chaos and unsettled situation, the Soconusco region was annexed by Mexico.

In 1844, 1848, and 1849, unsuccessful revolts against the dictatorship of Rafael Carrera briefly reproclaimed the independence of Los Altos.

Carrera's exile and Los Altos 

During his first term as president, Rafael Carrera brought the country back from excessive conservatism to a traditional climate. However, in 1848, the liberals were able to force Rafael Carrera to leave office, after the country had been in turmoil for several months.  Carrera resigned of his own free will and left for México. The new liberal regime allied itself with the Aycinena family and swiftly passed a law which they emphatically ordered the execution of Carrera if he dared to return to Guatemalan soil.

In his absence, the liberal criollos from Quetzaltenango — led by general Agustín Guzmán who occupied the city after Corregidor general Mariano Paredes was called to Guatemala City to take over the Presidential office- declared that Los Altos was an independent state once again on 26 August 1848; the new state had the support of Vasconcelos' regime in El Salvador and the rebel guerrilla army of Vicente and Serapio Cruz who were declared enemies of general Carrera. The interim government was led by Guzmán himself and had Florencio Molina and the priest Fernando Davila as his Cabinet members.

On 5 September 1848, the criollo altenses chose a formal government led by Fernando Antonio Martínez. In the meantime, Carrera returned to Guatemala and entered by Huehuetenango, where he met with the native leaders and told them that they had to remain united to prevail. The leaders agreed and slowly the segregated native communities started to develop a new Indian identity under Carrera's leadership. In the meantime, in the eastern part of Guatemala, the Jalapa region became increasingly dangerous; former president Mariano Rivera Paz and rebel leader Vicente Cruz were both murdered there after trying to take over the Corregidor office in 1849.

Upon learning that officer José Víctor Zavala had been appointed as Corregidor in Suchitepéquez, Carrera and his hundred jacalteco bodyguards crossed a dangerous jungle infested with jaguars to meet his former friend. When they met, Zavala not only did not capture him, but agreed to serve under his orders, thus sending a strong message to both liberal and conservatives in Guatemala City, who realized that they were forced to negotiate with Carrera, otherwise they were going to have to battle on two fronts — Quetzaltenango and Jalapa.

Carrera went back to the Quetzaltenango area, while Zavala remained in Suchitepéquez as a tactical maneuver. Carrera received a visit from a Cabinet member of Paredes and told him that he had control of the native population and that he would keep them appeased. When the emissary returned to Guatemala City, he told the president everything Carrera said, and added that the native forces were formidable.

Agustín Guzmán went to Antigua Guatemala to meet with another group of Paredes emissaries; they agreed that Los Altos would rejoin Guatemala, and that the latter would help Guzmán defeat his hated enemy and also build a port on the Pacific Ocean. Guzmán was sure of victory this time, but his plan evaporated when, in his absence, Carrera and his native allies occupied Quetzaltenango. Carrera appointed Ignacio Yrigoyen as Corregidor and convinced him that he should work with the K'iche', Q’anjob’al, and Mam leaders to keep the region under control. On his way out, Yrigoyen murmured to a friend: Now he is the King of the Indians, indeed!

The region is still distinctive, and Los Altos is still a nickname for the region of Guatemala around Quetzaltenango. Similarly, the Mexican portion of the former state is known as Los Altos de Chiapas.

See also 
 History of Guatemala
 Luis Batres Juarros
 Rafael Carrera

References

Bibliography

External links 
  Quetzaltenango en la Historia 
  Bandera de Guatemala

Notes 

States and territories disestablished in 1840
States and territories established in 1848
History of Guatemala
Federal Republic of Central America
Rafael Carrera
1838 establishments in Central America
1849 disestablishments in Central America
Former republics